Daniel Brian Crates (born 9 February 1973) is a British former athlete, who specialised in 800m sprinting. He is a former Paralympic world record holder in this event, and won gold medals in a number of international competitions, including the Paralympic Games, European Championships and World Championships. He also plays competitive rugby and is a qualified diving instructor.

Crates was born in Orsett, Essex. He took up athletics after losing his right arm in a car accident while in Australia in 1994. He competed in T46 (arm amputee) events and represented Britain at the 2000 Summer Paralympics in Sydney – winning the bronze medal in the 400m sprint, and at the 2004 Summer Paralympics in Athens where he won gold in the 800m.

After Sydney, Crates switched from the 400m to the 800m, in which he holds the world record with a time of 1:53.27 set in 2004 at the AAA Championships.

Crates also won gold in the 800m race at the European Championships in 2003, and again in 2005. He won gold in the same category at the World Indoor Championships in 2003. He had previously won gold running 400m at the European Championships in 2001. He won gold in the 800m race at the inaugural Paralympic World Cup in Manchester in 2004, but did not compete to retain his title in 2008.

He also plays competitive rugby within teams of non-amputee players.

Crates carried the Olympic torch in London in 2008 and was selected as flag bearer for the opening ceremony in the 2008 Summer Paralympics in Beijing.

Crates retired from athletics on 25 July 2009, after competing at the London Grand Prix at Crystal Palace. He came in third place in his last race and during his career Crates won 11 gold and 1 bronze medals.

He was part of the UK Channel 4 commentary team for the London 2012 Paralympics. His autobiography was published in 2012 and is called Danny Boy. Also on Channel 4 in 2017 he was part of the presenting team at the 2017 BDO World Darts Championship.

Since retiring from athletics, Danny Crates has become a motivational speaker and has made many TV appearances. He is a regular guest reporter on BBC's “Food: Truth or Scare”.

Crates took part in the 2015 series of Celebrity MasterChef.

References

External links

1973 births
Living people
Middle-distance runners with limb difference
Athletes (track and field) at the 2000 Summer Paralympics
Athletes (track and field) at the 2004 Summer Paralympics
Athletes (track and field) at the 2008 Summer Paralympics
Television presenters with disabilities
English amputees
English autobiographers
English male middle-distance runners
English male non-fiction writers
English motivational speakers
English rugby union players
English sports broadcasters
Medalists at the 2000 Summer Paralympics
Medalists at the 2004 Summer Paralympics
Paralympic athletes of Great Britain
Paralympic bronze medalists for Great Britain
Paralympic gold medalists for Great Britain
Paralympic medalists in athletics (track and field)
Rugby union players from Orsett
Sportsmen with disabilities
Paralympic middle-distance runners